Judo competitions at the 2022 South American Games in Asunción, Paraguay are scheduled to be held between October 11 and 13, 2022 at the Pavilion 2 of SND

Schedule
The competition schedule is as follows:

Medal summary

Medal table

Medalists

Men

Women

Mixed

Participation
Eleven nations will participate in judo events of the 2022 South American Games.

References

Judo
South American Games
2022
2022 South American Games